Aswathi Thirunal Rama Varma (born 13 August 1968), known colloquially as Prince Rama Varma, is an Indian classical musician and a member of the erstwhile Royal Family of Travancore. He is a Carnatic vocalist as well as an exponent of the Saraswati Veena. He is also recognized as a music teacher, musicologist, writer and orator. He has performed at concerts and conducted music workshops all over India and in several other countries including United States, UK, Netherlands, France, UAE, Malaysia and Singapore. YouTube videos of his concerts, classes and lecture-demonstrations are popular among music lovers, music students and professional musicians alike, and have exceeded 20 million views as of July 2022.

Early life

Rama Varma was born on 13 August 1968 and is a member of the Royal Family of Travancore. He is a direct descendant of Maharaja Swathi Thirunal.

He started formal vocal music lessons in 1982 under Prof. Vechoor Harihara Subramania Iyer, a senior disciple of Dr. Semmangudi Srinivasa Iyer, who continued to be his Guru until his demise in 1994. Later, Varma went on to become a senior disciple of Dr. Mangalampalli Balamuralikrishna. He also studied the Saraswathi Veena under Sri Trivandrum R. Venkataraman and Prof.K. S. Narayanaswamy.

Music career
Prince Rama Varma gave his maiden public performance in 1990, and released his first CD at the Queen Elizabeth Hall in London.  Since then, he has given concerts and talks in several notable venues across the globe including Arsenal de Metz, France; Zuiderpershuis, Belgium; the Royal Tropical Institute and The Waag, Amsterdam; the Korzo Theatre in The Hague; The Hindu Lit for Life Literary festival; Alliance Francaise and the Madras Music Academy.  He was invited to perform at the Rashtrapati Bhavan by the then president of India, Dr. A. P. J. Abdul Kalam.

Varma is recognized for his pioneering efforts to make classical music in its purest form appealing to the masses, by explaining the lyrics and background of every song during his concerts. His renditions are marked by purity of notes and clarity in enunciation of lyrics in any language.  Through his concerts, he propagates rare compositions of well-known composers such as the Trinity (Saint Tyagaraja, Muthuswami Dikshitar, Syama Shastri), Maharaja Swati Thirunal, Annamacharya and Dr. M. Balamuralikrishna, as well as compositions of lesser-known composers such as Etla Ramadasa, Kaiwara Amara Nareyana, Prayaga Rangadasa and Mallekonda Ramadasa. 

A fan of world music, Varma is inspired by Mozart, Beethoven, Bach, Kishore Kumar, K.L. Saigal, M.D. Ramanathan, Madurai Mani Iyer, Jacques Brel and Eartha Kitt among others.

He is the subject of a festschrift, Prince Rama Varma: Breaking Barriers, Building Bonds written by Lakshmy Menon on the occasion of his 50th birthday.

Teaching
Rama Varma's music classes and workshops are popular among music students ranging from beginners to professional musicians in India and abroad. He taught Indian music at the Rotterdam Conservatory, Codarts for many years. The Sri Venkateswara Bhakti Channel (SVBC) telecast over 200 episodes of his music lessons held at Hyderabad and at Perla, a small village in North Kerala.  Varma attempts to transcend language barriers in music through his workshops by teaching, for instance, Rabindra Sangeet to Kannada-speaking students and Malayalam compositions to students in Andhra Pradesh and Telangana

Music festivals

Prince Rama Varma organises the Swathi Sangeethotsavam, a 10-day annual festival held at the Kuthira Malika Palace in Thiruvananthapuram from 4–13 January. The festival, dedicated exclusively to the compositions of Maharaja Swathi Thirunal, features maestros of Carnatic and Hindustani music, and attracts music aficionados from all over the globe.

Varma also organises the annual Navarathri Mandapam concerts held in Trivandrum in connection with the Navaratri festival. In 2006, he got veteran vocalist Parassala Ponnammal to perform there, and permitted women to attend the concerts, thus breaking a 300-year-old tradition of not allowing women inside the Mandapam.

References

External links

 Video interview from webindia123.com
 Veena Concert Videos

1968 births
Carnatic instrumentalists
Male Carnatic singers
Carnatic singers
Living people
People from Thiruvananthapuram
Performers of Hindu music
Travancore royal family
Saraswati veena players
Musicians from Kerala
20th-century Indian male classical singers
21st-century Indian male classical singers